Elvira Menéndez (2 December 1022) was a queen consort of Leon by marriage to King Alfonso V.

Life
She was a member of the highest ranks of the nobility of Portugal and Galicia as the daughter of count Menendo González, Count of Portucale and his wife Toda (also known as Tutadomna, Tota).

She became Queen of León as the wife of King Alfonso V with whom she was raised as a child. Her father, Menendo, was a member of the curia regis of King Bermudo II of León and the tutor and co-regent, jointly with Queen Elvira Garcia, of Infante Alfonso, who later ruled as Alfonso V of León.

Queen Elvira died on 2 December 1022 and was buried in the Royal Pantheon of the Basilica of San Isidoro in León.

Issue 
Elvira had two children with Alfonso V whom she married in 1013: 
 Bermudo III of León, killed in 1037 in the Battle of Tamarón by count Ferdinand who was married to Sancha, Bermudo's sister; 
 Sancha of León, queen of León and the wife of Ferdinand I.

References

Bibliography 

  
 
 
 

Beni Alfons
Leonese queen consorts
Galician queens consort
11th-century Spanish women
11th-century Portuguese people
11th-century people from the Kingdom of León
11th-century Portuguese women
990s births
1022 deaths
Burials in the Royal Pantheon at the Basilica of San Isidoro